Yahoo! Babel Fish was a free Web-based multilingual translation application. In May 2012 it was replaced by Bing Translator (now Microsoft Translator), to which queries were redirected. Although Yahoo! has transitioned its Babel Fish translation services to Bing Translator, it did not sell its translation application to Microsoft outright. As the oldest free online language translator, the service translated text or Web pages in 36 pairs between 13 languages, including English, Simplified Chinese, Traditional Chinese, Dutch, French, German, Greek, Italian, Japanese, Korean, Portuguese, Russian, and Spanish.

The internet service derived its name from the Babel fish, a fictional species in Douglas Adams's book and radio series The Hitchhiker's Guide to the Galaxy that could instantly translate languages. In turn, the name of the fictional creature refers to the biblical account of the confusion of languages that arose in the city of Babel.

History 
On December 9, 1997, Digital Equipment Corporation (DEC) and SYSTRAN S.A. launched AltaVista Translation Service at babelfish.altavista.com, which was developed by a team of researchers at DEC. In February 2003, AltaVista was bought by Overture Services, Inc.
In July 2003, Overture, in turn, was taken over by Yahoo!.

The web address for Babel Fish remained at babelfish.altavista.com until May 9, 2008, when the address changed to babelfish.yahoo.com.

As of May 30, 2012, the Web address changed yet again, this time redirecting babelfish.yahoo.com to www.microsofttranslator.com when Microsoft's Bing Translator replaced Yahoo Babel Fish.

Yahoo! Babel Fish should not be confused with The BabelFish Corporation founded by Oscar Jofre, which was operated at the URL www.babelfish.com (created in 1995).

As of June 2013, babelfish.yahoo.com no longer redirected to the Microsoft Bing Translator. Instead, it refers directly back to the main Yahoo.com page.

Supported languages 

Chinese (Simplified) to English
Chinese (Traditional) to English
Dutch to English
Dutch to French
English to Chinese (Simplified)
English to Chinese (Traditional)
English to Dutch
English to French
English to German
English to Greek
English to Italian
English to Japanese
English to Korean
English to Portuguese
English to Russian
English to Spanish
French to Dutch
French to English
French to German
French to Greek
French to Italian
French to Portuguese
French to Spanish
German to English
German to French
Greek to English
Greek to French
Italian to English
Italian to French
Japanese to English
Korean to English
Portuguese to English
Portuguese to French
Russian to English
Spanish to English
Spanish to French

See also 

Apertium
Comparison of machine translation applications
Google Translate
Jollo (discontinued)
List of Yahoo!-owned sites and services
Microsoft Translator
SYSTRAN
Yandex.Translate

References

External links 
Archive of the Yahoo! Babel Fish page

Discontinued Yahoo! services
Machine translation software
Natural language processing software
Products introduced in 1997
Translation websites
Babel Fish